Sugar Creek is a stream in Clark County in the U.S. state of Missouri. It is a tributary of Honey Creek.

Sugar Creek was named for the sugar maple timber lining its course.

See also
List of rivers of Missouri

References

Rivers of Clark County, Missouri
Rivers of Missouri